Eloy Casagrande (born 29 January 1991) is a Brazilian musician, best known as the drummer of thrash metal band Sepultura and hard rock act Iahweh.

Biography
Casagrande replaced Jean Dolabella in Sepultura, who left the band in November 2011, and is their youngest member. He is also known for his time with power metal singer Andre Matos and post-hardcore/metalcore band Gloria.

Casagrande began playing at age seven, when he got a toy drum from his mother; after a year, he got a real drum kit. In 2004, at age 13, he was the winner of the Batuka International Drummer Fest, sponsored by Vera Figueiredo. Later, Casagrande also won Modern Drummer's Undiscovered Drummer Contest 2006 in New Jersey, and the following year, toured the United States.

Discography 
2009: Mentalize with Andre Matos
2009: Neblim with Iahweh
2010: Landscape Revolution with Aclla
2012: (Re)Nascido with Gloria
2013: The Mediator Between Head and Hands Must Be the Heart with Sepultura
2014: "Over Dee Moon" / "5 Years Thinking Outside Your Box" with Daniel Piquê
2017: Machine Messiah with Sepultura
2020: Quadra with Sepultura

References 

1991 births
Living people
Sepultura members
Brazilian heavy metal drummers
People from Santo André, São Paulo
21st-century drummers